The Roman Catholic Diocese of Guarenas is a diocese located in the city of Guarenas in the Ecclesiastical province of Caracas in Venezuela.

History
On 30 November 1996 Blessed John Paul II established the Diocese of Guarenas from the Diocese of Los Teques.

Ordinaries
Gustavo García Naranjo (30 Nov 1996 – present)

See also 
 Roman Catholicism in Venezuela

References

External links
 GCatholic.org
 Catholic Hierarchy 

Roman Catholic dioceses in Venezuela
Roman Catholic Ecclesiastical Province of Caracas, Santiago de Venezuela
Christian organizations established in 1996
Roman Catholic dioceses and prelatures established in the 20th century
1996 establishments in Venezuela
Guarenas